Aberdeen is an elevated station on the Canada Line of Metro Vancouver's SkyTrain rapid transit system. It is located in Richmond, British Columbia, Canada. It is named after the adjacent Aberdeen Square and Aberdeen Centre, the largest of Richmond's Asian-themed malls.

Location
Aberdeen station is located south of the intersection of No.3 Road and Cambie Road. The station is located in close proximity to numerous Asian-themed shopping centres along Richmond's Golden Village, including (from north to south) Yaohan Centre, President Plaza, Aberdeen Centre, and Parker Place. The station's east (northbound) platform is connected via overhead walkway across to Aberdeen Square and Aberdeen Centre malls.

Station name
The station was originally planned to be called "Cambie station" by RAV Project Management (RAVCO), and the City of Richmond confirmed its preference for this name in July 2005. However, a naming study conducted by the Canada Line Project Management Ltd. (renamed from RAVCO) identified some concerns with that name, among them the potential for confusion since "Cambie" is used as a street name in both Richmond and Vancouver (where Canada Line runs under Cambie Street).

The study suggested the following alternate names for the city's consideration: "International station", "Riverside station", "Golden Village station", "Golden Plaza station", "Asia Pacific station", and "Aberdeen station". The first two options were selected as the internal staff recommendation; on the other hand, "Aberdeen station" was not recommended by the naming study in order to avoid commercial naming, although the name could be justified on the grounds that "Aberdeen Village" is the name of the planning sub-area the station is located in.

The City of Richmond's planning committee voted on April 4, 2006, in favour of renaming it "Aberdeen station", which it claimed "would be readily identifiable in the community and synonymous with economic and population growth."

Station information

Station layout

Bus routes
The following bus routes are located nearby:

 403 Three Road / Bridgeport Station
 410 Richmond–Brighouse Station / 22nd Street Station
 N10 Richmond–Brighouse Station / Downtown

References

Canada Line stations
Railway stations in Canada opened in 2009
Buildings and structures in Richmond, British Columbia
2009 establishments in British Columbia